Doris Betts (June 4, 1932 – April 21, 2012) was a short story writer, novelist, essayist and Alumni Distinguished Professor Emerita at University of North Carolina at Chapel Hill. She was the author of three short story collections and six novels.

Profile
Betts was born in Statesville, North Carolina in 1932, the only child of Mary Ellen and William Elmore. In 1950 she graduated from Statesville High School, and attended the University of North Carolina at Greensboro. While an undergraduate student she married then law student Lowry Betts, who later became a district judge in Chatham and Orange Counties, North Carolina; they had three children. She won the Mademoiselle College Fiction contest during her sophomore year (1953) for the story "Mr. Shawn and Father Scott".

After working as a newspaper reporter for a number of years, Betts joined the faculty of the University of North Carolina at Chapel Hill in 1966. She received the UNC Putnam Book Prize in 1954 for her first book, The Gentle Insurrection, three Sir Walter Raleigh Awards (1958, 1965, and 1973) for the best fiction books by a North Carolinian, a Guggenheim Fellowship in Creative Writing (1958–1959), the North Carolina Award and Medal (1975), the Distinguished Service Award for Women (Chi Omega), and the John Dos Passos Award from Longwood College. She has also written articles for professional journals, lectured at writers' conferences, and delivered speeches on major college campuses. In 1980 she was named a UNC Alumni Distinguished Professor of English. She received the Tanner Award for distinguished undergraduate teaching in 1973 and the Katherine Carmichael Teaching Award in 1980. 

Violet, a film adaptation of "The Ugliest Pilgrim", her most widely reprinted short story, won Best Live Action Short at the 54th Academy Awards. In 1998, it was the basis of a musical, also named Violet, which won the New York Drama Critics Circle Award.

Coinciding with her retirement from teaching, the Doris Betts Distinguished Professor in Creative Writing, an endowed chair, was established in her honor. SHE served as the Chancellor of the Fellowship of Southern Writers.

Producer, Nancy Bevins, adapted Betts's short story, "This is the Only Time I'll Tell It" into a short film in 1998. Awarded a Humanities Council Grant, the film premiered at Salem College in Winston-Salem, North Carolina with Betts in attendance.

Betts died at her Pittsboro, North Carolina home of lung cancer on April 21, 2012, aged 79.

Awards
 G.P. Putnam-U.N.C. Booklength Fiction prize, 1954
 Sir Walter Raleigh Best Fiction by Carolinian award, 1957, for Tall Houses in Winter; 1965, for Scarlet Thread
 Guggenheim Fellow 1958
 North Carolina Medal, 1975, for literature
 Parker award, 1982–1985, for literary achievement
 John dos Passos award, 1983
 American Academy of Arts and Letters Medal of Merit, 1989, for short story
 Academy Award, for Violet.

Books

Short fiction collections
The Gentle Insurrection (1954)
The Astronomer and Other Stories (1966)
Beasts of the Southern Wild and Other Stories (1973)

Novels
Tall Houses in Winter (1957)
The Scarlet Thread (1965)
The River to Pickle Beach (1972)
Heading West: A Novel (1981)
Souls Raised from the Dead (1994)
The Sharp Teeth of Love (1998)

References

External links
"The big questions: an interview with Doris Betts", Christian Century, October 8, 1997, by Dale W. Brown

1932 births
2012 deaths
People from Statesville, North Carolina
People from Pittsboro, North Carolina
Novelists from North Carolina
Deaths from lung cancer in North Carolina
University of North Carolina at Chapel Hill faculty
American women short story writers
American women novelists
20th-century American novelists
20th-century American women writers
20th-century American short story writers
American women academics
21st-century American women